Ernest Lawrence Fields (August 28, 1904 – May 11, 1997) was an American trombonist, pianist, arranger and bandleader. He first became known for leading the Royal Entertainers, a territory band which was based in Tulsa, Oklahoma, and toured along a circuit stretching from Kansas City, Kansas, to Dallas, Texas. In later years he led a band that recorded in Los Angeles.

Early life and career
Fields was born in Nacogdoches, Texas, and was raised in Taft, Oklahoma. He attended Tuskegee Institute and then moved to Tulsa.

Over the course of his career a number of musicians who were to become well known passed through his band.  These included vocalist and drummer Roy Milton.

From the late 1920s, he led a band called the Royal Entertainers, and eventually began touring more widely, and recording. Supported by Bob Wills, Fields' band became the first African-American band to play at the landmark Cain's Ballroom in Tulsa. In 1939, he was invited to New York City by John Hammond to record for the Vocalion label, and began to tour nationally. He did not become a star, but continued to work steadily, recording for smaller labels, and gradually transforming his sound through a smaller band and a repertoire shift from big band, swing to R&B. During World War II, he entertained troops both at home and abroad.

Later career
He continued to straddle these styles into the 1950s, playing swing standards such as "Tuxedo Junction" and "Begin the Beguine" in a rocking R&B style. In the late 1950s he moved to Los Angeles, joining Rendezvous Records, for whom he ran the house band. This included pianist Ernie Freeman, guitarist Rene Hall (who had previously worked with Fields in the 1930s), saxophonist Plas Johnson, and drummer Earl Palmer. In 1959 this band had an international hit with an R&B version of Glenn Miller's "In the Mood", credited to the Ernie Fields Orchestra, which reached number 4 on the Billboard chart. The track also peaked at number 13 in the UK Singles Chart. It sold over one million copies, and was awarded a gold disc. The band, with minor changes of personnel, went on to record instrumentals under many different names, including B. Bumble and the Stingers, the Marketts and the Routers.

Rendezvous Records folded in late 1963, and Fields retired soon after and returned to Tulsa. He died in May 1997, at the age of 92. In 2013 his family donated his memorabilia to the planned Oklahoma Museum of Popular Culture.

His son is the saxophonist and bandleader Ernie Fields, Jr., and his daughter Carmen became a journalist in Boston, where she co-hosted the evening news for WGBH-TV.

References

External links
 Encyclopedia of Oklahoma History and Culture - Fields, Ernie

1904 births
1997 deaths
American music arrangers
Jamie Records artists
Combo Records artists
People from Nacogdoches, Texas
People from Muskogee County, Oklahoma
Musicians from Tulsa, Oklahoma
Tuskegee University alumni
Vocalion Records artists
20th-century American musicians
20th-century African-American musicians